is a Japanese  classical guitarist. He has released more than 60 albums, including in Memoriam: Takemitsu: Guitar Works, his interpretation of works by the Japanese composer Toru Takemitsu.
Shin-ichi Fukuda Official Website

See also
 Toru Takemitsu
 Sergio Assad
Leo Brouwer

References

External links
 "Shin-Ichi Fukuda: Profile"
Shin-ichi Fukuda Official Website

1955 births
Living people
Musicians from Osaka
Japanese classical guitarists